Tarsney is an unincorporated community in Jackson County, in the U.S. state of Missouri.

History
A post office called Tarsney was established in 1891, and remained in operation until 1902. The community has the name of John Charles Tarsney, a state legislator.

References

Unincorporated communities in Jackson County, Missouri
Unincorporated communities in Missouri